East Lound is a hamlet in the civil parish of Haxey in North Lincolnshire, England. East Lound forms part of the Isle of Axholme.

East Lound is recorded in the 1086 Domesday Book as "Lund", being a name for both the later East Lound and Graizelound, and under both the entry for Haxey and Owston Ferry in the hundred of Epworth. The lord of the manor following Domesday was Geoffrey of la Guerche, who was also Tenant-in-chief to King William I.

In 1855 East Lound occupations included fifteen farmers, two wheelwrights, and a shopkeeper who was also a shoemaker. By 1885 the number of farmers had reduced to twelve and there was only one wheelwright. In 1933 there were ten farmers and a smallholder, a seed grower, and one shop with two shopkeepers. A Primitive Methodist chapel was built at East Lound in 1862, and was closed in 1958.

References

External links

"Haxey", includes East Lound. The Isle of Axholme Family History Society. Retrieved 10 July 2014
Haxey Parish Council website, includes East Lound. Retrieved 10 July 2014
"Haxey", Isleofaxholme.net, includes East Lound. Retrieved 10 July 2014

Hamlets in Lincolnshire
Borough of North Lincolnshire